Leo Geoghegan (16 May 1936 - 2 March 2015) was an Australian former racing driver. He was the elder of two sons of former New South Wales car dealer Tom Geoghegan, both of whom become dominant names in Australian motor racing in the 1960s. While his younger brother Ian "Pete" Geoghegan had much of his success in touring car racing, winning five Australian Touring Car Championships, Leo spent most of his racing career in open wheel racing cars.

Career
Leo also drove Group E Series Production Cars and Group C touring cars at the annual Bathurst 500/1000 endurance race for the Ford Works Team, Chrysler Australia and the Holden Dealer Team. This gave him the distinction of being the only driver to race for all three Australian factory backed teams.

Leo and Ian Geoghegan drove their Ford Cortina Mk.I GT500 in the 1965 Armstrong 500 at Bathurst while wearing business suits as part of a sponsorship deal with a Sydney clothing store. After crossing the line in second place, the brothers were later disqualified for restarting their Cortina during a pit stop. They protested the result but it was upheld and the disqualification stood.

His best finish at Bathurst for the endurance race was second in 1967 driving a Ford XR Falcon GT with his brother Ian. The pair were flagged in first, but a protest by teammate Harry Firth saw the brothers relegated to second after a re-count of the lap charts. Unfortunately for Leo and Ian, just two hours after the start their Falcon ran out of petrol after it had passed the pits. Leo, who in the car at the time, was able to drive through the back gate into the pits to be refueled, which led the lap scorers to mistakenly credit the #53 Ford with a lap it did not complete. The race was then awarded to Firth and his co-driver Fred Gibson. Until his death in 2015, Leo Geoghegan believed that the lap scorers had it correct the first time and that he and his brother should be in the record books as Bathurst winners in 1967.

Leo & Ian won the 1962 Bathurst Six Hour Classic at Mount Panorama driving a Daimler SP250 sports car, (that year the 500 mile race for touring cars were held at Phillip Island)

Leo also finished 3rd outright in the 1973 Hardie-Ferodo 1000 (the year the race was extended from 500 miles to 1000 kilometres) co-driving with Colin Bond in a Holden Dealer Team LJ Torana GTR XU-1. Ironically, the HDT was then run by Harry Firth while Leo's older brother Ian won the race co-driving with Allan Moffat in a Ford Works Team XA Falcon GT Hardtop. Leo later stated that the Torana was one of his least favourite cars he drove at Bathurst.

Other career highlights included victories in the following:
 1960 Australian GT Championship
 1962 Bathurst Six Hour Classic
 1963 Australian Formula Junior Championship
 1968 Surfers Paradise 6 Hour
 1969 JAF Grand Prix (Formula Libre)
 1970 Australian Drivers' Championship
 1973 Australian Formula 2 Championship
 1974 Australian Formula 2 Championship

Leo Geoghegan was the principal driver for Chrysler Australia during the period (1970–1972) when the company supported Valiant Pacer and Valiant Charger Series Production touring car teams. During this time, Leo and big brother Ian were involved in testing a ute fitted with a 5.6 litre, 340ci V8 engine and with the R/T Charger's wheelbase at the Mallala circuit in South Australia. The Geoghegan's reported that the extra weight of the V8 gave the car severe understeer and required earlier brake points. As a result, lap times were around 2–3 seconds slower than when the car was fitted with the Hemi six, though it was expected that the long straights and more open nature of the Mount Panorama Circuit would better suit the V8 engined car. The V8 Charger, which Chrysler Australia denied was to be used in Series Production racing, was eventually killed off in the Supercar scare in mid-1972 along with the V8 Holden Torana GTR XU-1 and the Ford Falcon GTHO Phase IV.

In addition to being a multi-Australian championship winning driver, Geoghegan has the rare distinction for an Australian of having won an international grand prix, specifically the inaugural JAF Grand Prix in 1969 held over 40 laps of the 6 km (3.728 mi) Fuji Speedway. Driving his ex-Jim Clark Lotus 39-Repco V8 in the race held for Formula Libre cars (which included Formula 2 and 1.6 litre cars) by the Japan Automobile Federation (JAF), Geoghegan was part of a large Australian contingent including Alec Mildren Racing with their drivers Kevin Bartlett and Max Stewart (Bartlett driving a 2.5L Mildren-Alfa Romeo V8, and Stewart driving a 1.6L Mildren-Waggott), Garrie Cooper in his own Elfin 600-Repco, and Glynn Scott driving a Bowin P3-Ford Cosworth. The Australian's all qualified at the front end of the grid, with Geoghegan third. He purposefully made a slow start so as not to strip the new gears in his Lotus and drove a steady race. As others fell out, he passed Stewart to take a lead he was not to lose. Geoghegan also set a new F2 lap record during the race with a 1:52.67 for an average of 119.7 mph.

Death
Leo Geoghegan died on 2 March 2015 at the age of 78 after a long battle with prostate cancer. He was survived by his widow, Del; sister Marie-Louise; two sons, Steven and Shaun; and two daughters Roslyn Naomi; and cousin Warren Geoghegan.

Career results

Complete Tasman Series results

Complete Phillip Island/Bathurst 500/1000 results

References

Australian racing drivers
2015 deaths
Tasman Series drivers
Australian Formula 2 drivers
Australian people of Irish descent
1936 births